Palomeras Sureste is a ward (barrio) of Madrid belonging to the district of Puente de Vallecas.

Wards of Madrid
Puente de Vallecas